Milad Alexandre Mack Atala (born June 3, 1968) is a South American chef of palestinian and Irish ancestry, who runs the restaurant D.O.M. (Latin abbreviation of Deo optimo maximo) in São Paulo. In May 2012, D.O.M. was rated the 4th best restaurant in the world by the S.Pellegrino World's 50 Best Restaurants, published by Restaurant magazine. His establishment also holds the title of "Acqua Panna Best Restaurant In South America." He's known for transforming traditional Brazilian dishes, adapting French and Italian culinary techniques to native Brazilian ingredients. Atala also hosted a television show on Brazilian TV channel GNT.
In 2013, he founded Atá, an institute about relation with food, with Roberto Smeraldi and Carlos Alberto Ricardo, among others. In 2019, Atala and his institute were accused of misappropriating the name "Cerrado vanilla" by registering it as a commercial name at the Brazilian Institute for Industrial Property (INPI), without prior consultation to rural communities who traditionally use the ingredient in their food cultures. In 2020, Atala was accused of sexual harassment by a former employee.

Books 
 Por uma Gastronomia Brasileira - Alex Atala - Editora Bei, 2003 - 
 Com Unhas, Dentes & Cuca - Alex Atala - Editora Senac, 2008
 Escoffianas Brasileiras - Alex Atala - Editora Larousse Brasil, 2008 -

Film 
Alex Atala has appeared in Chef's Table Season 2, Episode 2.

References
 Alex Atala – Yes we have Priprioca, and much more! - S. Pellegrino World's 50 Best Restaurants, by Luciana Bianchi

External links

DOM Restaurante
Dalva e Dito Restaurante
Atá Institute (English version)

1968 births
Living people
People from São Bernardo do Campo
Brazilian people of Irish descent
Brazilian people of Palestinian descent
Brazilian DJs
Brazilian restaurateurs
Brazilian chefs
Brazilian columnists